So Awkward is a sitcom series on CBBC following the lives of a group of friends in secondary school. It stars Cleo Demetriou as Lily Hampton, Ameerah Falzon-Ojo and Emily Burnett (in series 6) as Jas (Jasmine) Salford, Sophia Dall'aglio as Martha Fitzgerald, Archie Lyndhurst as Ollie Coulton, Jamie Flatters as Matt (Matthew) Furnish, Samuel Small as Rob Edwards and Raif Clarke as Sid Bevan . The thirteen-episode first series began on 21 May 2015, and finished on 6 August 2015. Another thirteen-episode series began on 25 August 2016 and ended on 17 November 2016, followed by a thirteen-episode third series, which began on 31 August 2017, and ended on 23 November 2017.

A fourth series, fifth and sixth series were ordered in early 2018, 2019, 2020, Series 4 started airing in August 2018 and Series 5 began airing September 2019, Series 6 began on 6 August 2020. However, each episode comes out early on BBC iPlayer.

On 22 September 2020, Lyndhurst died of a brain haemorrhage, aged 19. He was the son of the Only Fools and Horses actor Nicholas Lyndhurst.

A thirteen-part spin-off series titled, "Still So Awkward", premiered on CBBC and BBC iPlayer on 27 July 2021. This series introduced new characters such as Maxim Ays as Seb (Sebastian) Faulks Smythe, Esmond Cole as Samson Rosling, Indigo Griffiths as Frankie Simpson, Arian Nik as Josh Cooper, Ellie Clayton as Claire Fox, Ali Kahn as Meg Watson and Steve Marsh as Steve Grinstead. The only characters to appear from the main series were Lily Hampton, Jeff Malone and Rufus Walpole.

Cast and characters

Episodes

Series 1 (2015)

Series 2 (2016)

Series 3 (2017)

Series 4 (2018)

Series 5 (2019)

Series 6 (2020)

References

External links
 
 
 

2015 British television series debuts
2020 British television series endings
2010s British children's television series
2010s British teen sitcoms
2020s British children's television series
2020s British teen sitcoms
CBBC shows
BBC children's television shows
BBC high definition shows
Children's television sitcoms
English-language television shows
Television series about teenagers
Television shows set in the United Kingdom